The Statue of Ramesses II  is a 3,200-year-old figure of Ramesses II, depicting him standing. It was discovered in 1820 by Giovanni Battista Caviglia at the Great Temple of Ptah near Memphis, Egypt. It is made from red granite and weighs 83 tons.

The statue was found broken in six pieces and earlier attempts at restoration failed. In 1955, Egyptian Prime Minister Gamal Abdel Nasser moved it to the large Bab Al-Hadid Square in Cairo, outside Cairo's main railway station; the square was then renamed Ramses Square. There the statue was restored to its full height of 11 meters and erected on a three-metre pedestal at the edge of a fountain. It was stabilized by iron bars inside the body.

Over time Ramses Square turned out to be an unsuitable location, as the statue was exposed to corrosive pollution and constant vibration from traffic and subways. The Egyptian government decided to relocate it to a more appropriate location in 2006. At a temporary site on the Giza Plateau it underwent restoration before being moved to the Grand Egyptian Museum (GEM) in Giza in 2018.

The transportation of the statue from Ramses Square to Giza was a technological challenge that had been in the planning since 2002. A replica had been made and was transported several weeks before the scheduled actual move along the planned route to Giza to test the proposed relocation process. The move took place on August 25, 2006. During its ten-hour transport the statue was wrapped and covered in rubber foam. Two flat-back trucks carried the weight of the statue and its support structures as it travelled in a vertical position.

The move has been criticized for its costs and the concern about pollution in the Giza location.

References

External links
Website of Dr. Zahi Hawass about the statue
Website of BBC News about A stone carving of Ramesses II found at Abu Simbel

1820 archaeological discoveries
Buildings and structures in Cairo
Sculptures of ancient Egypt
Ramesses
Granite sculptures
Relocated ancient Egyptian monuments
Cultural depictions of Ramesses II